John 20:3–4 are the third and fourth verses of the twentieth chapter of the Gospel of John in the New Testament. Peter and the Beloved Disciple have been informed by Mary Magdalene that Jesus' tomb has been opened and in these verses they depart for the tomb.

Content
In the King James Version of the Bible the text reads:
3: Peter therefore went forth, and that other 
disciple, and came to the sepulchre.
4: So they ran both together: and the other disciple 
did outrun Peter, and came first to the sepulchre.

The English Standard Version translates the passage as:
3: So Peter went out with the other disciple,
and they were going toward the tomb. 
4: Both of them were running together, but the other disciple
outran Peter and reached the tomb first.

For a collection of other versions, see BibleHub John 20:3- 20:4.

Analysis
John Calvin notes the zeal that causes the two disciples to depart immediately to inspect the situation when they hear the news of the opened tomb. It is never explained why the disciples move from travelling into running. It is often speculated that the tomb has come within sight and the two only run the last stretch.  The act of running shows the deep concern the disciples had for the fate of Jesus' body.

Westcott notes that the passage clearly indicates that Peter takes the lead and the Beloved Disciple merely follows him. The main issue of interpretation is why the Beloved Disciple out races Peter to the tomb. Some scholars have seen this as a metaphoric, elevating the Beloved Disciple over Peter. Peter perhaps being denigrated for his actions around the crucifixion. Most scholars disagree with this view. The tradition that the Beloved Disciple was the author of John made it necessary for him to be considerably younger than Peter. His youthful vigour is thus a common explanation for why he beats Peter. The Disciple's great love for Jesus is also considered as a possible explanation.

References

Bibliography
John Calvin's commentary on John 20:1-9
Jesus Appears to His Disciples

20:03
Saint Peter